Forerunner is the third album by the Eastern-Canadian Celtic band The Cottars.

Track listing
 Waterlily (Karine Polwart/Bay Songs Ltd., ASCAP) – 4:29
 Miss Casey Medley – 1:59
 Miss Casey's Jig (trad., arr. Allister MacGillivray/Cabot Trail Music, SOCAN)
 The Humours of Ballinafauna (trad., arr. Allister MacGillivray/Cabot Trail Music, SOCAN)
 Byker Hill (trad., arr. Allister MacGillivray/Cabot Trail Music, SOCAN) – 2:48
 Atlantic Blue  Ron Hynes/Blue Murder/Sold For A Song, SOCAN) – 4:14
 Some Polkas – 3:14
 Johnny Mickey's Polka (trad., arr. Allister MacGillivray/Cabot Trail Music, SOCAN)
 Ballydesmond Polka (trad., arr. Allister MacGillivray/Cabot Trail Music, SOCAN)
 The Magic Slipper Polka (trad., arr. Allister MacGillivray/Cabot Trail Music, SOCAN)
 Pat Works On The Railway (trad., arr. Allister MacGillivray/Cabot Trail Music, SOCAN) – 4:25
 Georgia Lee (Tom Waits-Kathleen Brennan/Jalma Music) – 4:34
 Sliabh Na mBan (trad., arr. Ciarán MacGillivray/Cabot Trail Music, SOCAN) – 3:04
 Home By Bearna (trad., arr. Allister MacGillivray/Cabot Trail Music, SOCAN) – 2:33
 Jo MacPhee's Jig (Allister MacGillivray/Cabot Trail Music, SOCAN)
 Send Me A River (Sinéad Lohan/RykoMusic Ltd. MCPS) – 3:45
 Honeysuckle Medley – 4:10
 The Honeysuckle Hornpipe (trad., arr. Allister MacGillivray-Roseanne MacKenzie/Cabot Trail Music, SOCAN)
 The Dancing Strathspey (trad., arr. Allister MacGillivray-Roseanne MacKenzie/Cabot Trail Music, SOCAN)
 Jenny Dang the Weaver (trad., arr. Allister MacGillivray-Roseanne MacKenzie/Cabot Trail Music, SOCAN)
 The Randy Wife of Greelaw (trad., arr. Allister MacGillivray-Roseanne MacKenzie/Cabot Trail Music, SOCAN)
 Crossing the Minch (trad., arr. Allister MacGillivray-Roseanne MacKenzie/Cabot Trail Music, SOCAN)
 Hold On (Tom Waits-Kathleen Brennan/Jalma Music) – 4:37

Credits 
Lakewind Sound sessions (Cape Breton Island)
 The Cottars
 Ciarán MacGillivray: vocals, piano, guitar, electric guitar (Strat), Bb whistle, bodhrán, accordion
 Fiona MacGillivray: vocals, whistle, bodhrán
 Jimmy MacKenzie: guitar, tenor banjo
 Roseanne MacKenzie: harmony vocals, fiddle, percussion
 Additional Musicians
 Jamie Gatti - bass
 Allister MacGillivray
 Beverly MacGillivray
Sound Emporium sessions (Nashville)
 Gordie Sampson: guitar, bouzouki, piano
 Mike Brignardello: bass
 Tom Bukovac: guitars, piano
 Shannon Forrest: drums, percussion
 David Henry: cello
 Jimmy Rankin: additional vocals on Atlantic Blue

2006 albums
The Cottars albums